Zuberi also written as Zubairi, Zubairy, Zoberi, Zobairi is a surname from Arabic. Notable people with the surname include: 

Ziauddin Ahmed
Iqbal Zuberi
Itrat Husain Zuberi
Laila Zuberi
Muhammad Suhail Zubairy
Roohi Zuberi
Rukhsana Zuberi
Sameer Zuberi (physician)
Sameer Zuberi (politician)

Arabic-language surnames